Valparai is a Taluk and hill station in the Coimbatore district of Tamil Nadu, India.

Valparai may also refer to:

 Valparai taluk
 Valparai (state assembly constituency)

See also
 Valparaiso (disambiguation)